Prosiana is an urban-type settlement in Synelnykove Raion of Dnipropetrovsk Oblast in Ukraine. It is located at the east of the oblast, southeast of the city of Dnipro. Prosiana belongs to Malomyhailivka rural hromada, one of the hromadas of Ukraine. Population: 

Until 18 July 2020, Prosiana belonged to Pokrovske Raion. The raion was abolished in July 2020 as part of the administrative reform of Ukraine, which reduced the number of raions of Dnipropetrovsk Oblast to seven. The area of Pokrovske Raion was merged into Synelnykove Raion.

Economy

Transportation
Prosiana has access to the Highway H15 connecting Zaporizhia with Marinka.

Prosiana railway station is on the railway line connecting Dnipro via Synelnykove and Chaplyne with Pokvovsk. There is infrequent passenger traffic.

References

Urban-type settlements in Synelnykove Raion